Bullappanakoppa is a village in Dharwad district of Karnataka, India.

Demographics
As of the 2011 Census of India there were 228 households in Bullappanakoppa and a total population of 1,098 consisting of 573 males and 525 females. There were 108 children ages 0-6.

References

Villages in Dharwad district